Joint Mitnor Cave, also known as Bone Cave, is a limestone cave situated in the now disused Higher Kiln Quarry near Buckfastleigh, in Devon, England. The cave is one of a number at the quarry and in the surrounding area, and is managed by the Pengelly Trust.

Palaeontology 

The cave has been excavated and its animal remains examined on several occasions. The first period of excavation was in 1939–41, when over 4000 mammal bones were discovered deposited in the cave.

In September 2015, thieves broke into the cave (despite its locked steel door) and stole a number of fossil bones which were on display in their original setting. Reconstructions of the stolen fossils were later produced by 3D printing by academics and put on show in the cave in their place.

References 

Caves of Devon